Diocese of Pretoria may refer to:

 the Anglican Diocese of Pretoria
 the Roman Catholic Archdiocese of Pretoria